Nordlinger is a surname. Notable people with the surname include:

Jay Nordlinger (born 1963), American journalist
Joseph Yuspa Nördlinger Hahn (died 1637), German rabbi
Rachel Nordlinger, Australian linguist and academic
Zelda Nordlinger (1932–2008), American feminist and women's rights activist 
German toponymic surnames